Lewis Montgomery (died 1568), of Ecton, Northamptonshire, was an English politician.

Family
Montgomery was the first husband of Jane Lane; they had no surviving children and his heirs were his siblings.

Education and career
He was educated at Gray's Inn. He was a Member (MP) of the Parliament of England for Northampton in 1563; he had also been returned for Dorchester but chose Northampton.

References

Year of birth missing
1568 deaths
English MPs 1563–1567
Members of Gray's Inn
People from Ecton, Northamptonshire